Drug use may refer to any drug use; or:

 Entheogen
 Performance-enhancing drugs
 Pharmaceutical drug
 Poly drug use
 Polysubstance dependence
 Recreational drug use
 Self-medication
 Substance abuse
 Substance dependence

See also
Drug injection
Drug policy of Portugal
Golden Triangle (Southeast Asia)
History of United States drug prohibition
Illegal drug trade
Prohibition of drugs
War on Drugs
East African drug trade